Ling Ma is a Chinese American novelist and assistant professor of practice in the Arts at the University of Chicago. Her first book, Severance, won a 2018 Kirkus Prize and was listed as a New York Times Notable Book of 2018 and shortlisted for the 2019 Hemingway Foundation/PEN Award. Her second book, Bliss Montage, won The Story Prize.

Early life
Ma was born in Sanming, Fujian, China, initially an only child because of China's "one-child policy." She grew up in Utah, Nebraska, and Kansas. She has an AB from the University of Chicago and received an MFA from Cornell University.

Career
Ma's debut novel, Severance, is described as "a biting indictment of late-stage capitalism and a chilling vision of what comes after, but that doesn’t mean it’s a Marxist screed or a dry Hobbesian thought experiment." Severance is a novel that is partially post-apocalyptic horror, and partially office satire. It follows the novel's narrator in the aftermath of the outbreak of a deadly fever that has killed almost everyone in the US. An earlier chapter from the book won a 2015 Disquiet Literary Prize, the Graywolf Prize.

Ma began the novel while working as a fact checker for Playboy, a job she held from 2009 to 2012. It began as a short story, written in her office during her last few months there; after her layoff, it became a novel which she wrote while living on severance pay. She took four years to write it, and finished the novel at Cornell as part of the work in her MFA program. Ma said she "felt pressured to write a traditional immigration novel" while in the MFA program at Cornell, but instead decided to write about otherness and alienation via the trope of zombie apocalypse.

Ma has also published short stories in Granta, Playboy, and the Chicago Reader. Ma's short story "Peking Duck" appears in the 2022 The New Yorker  Fiction Issue. Her first collection of short stories, Bliss Montage, was published in September 2022. The collection was a finalist for the National Book Critics Circle Award in Fiction.

Works

References

External links
 Personal website

Living people
21st-century American novelists
American women novelists
American writers of Chinese descent
Cornell University alumni
People from Sanming
Chinese emigrants to the United States
University of Chicago alumni
University of Chicago faculty
Writers from Fujian
American women short story writers
21st-century American short story writers
21st-century American women writers
Kirkus Prize winners
1983 births
American women academics